Sidney Andrew was a British gymnast. He competed in the men's team all-around event at the 1920 Summer Olympics.

References

External links

Year of birth missing
Year of death missing
British male artistic gymnasts
Olympic gymnasts of Great Britain
Gymnasts at the 1920 Summer Olympics
Place of birth missing